Senator Kern may refer to:

John W. Kern (1849–1917), U.S. Senator from Indiana from 1911 to 1917
John Kern (Iowa politician) (1833–1889), member of the Iowa Senate from 1862 to 1864, father of Charles
Charles B. Kern (1867–1942), member of the Iowa Senate from 1925 to 1929